Hellinikon Stadium is a stadium located at the Hellinikon Olympic Complex in Hellinikon, Athens, located approximately 8 kilometres south of the center of Athens, near Glyfada on the Aegean Sea coast. Ethnikos Piraeus F.C. currently plays its home matches there.

The complex was built on the site of the former Hellinikon International Airport for the staging of the 2004 Summer Olympics and 2004 Summer Paralympics and consisted of the following venues: Hellinikon Indoor Arena (Basketball and Team handball); Hellinikon Fencing Hall; Olympic Hockey Stadium (Field hockey); Helliniko Baseball Centre; Hellinikon Olympic Softball Stadium; and Hellinikon Slalom Centre (Whitewater slalom).

The Olympic Baseball Centre's main stadium underwent renovations for football use, and Ethnikos began playing matches there during the 2007–08 season; the team played its first official match in its new home on October 20, 2007. The facility became known as Hellinikon Stadium, and is commonly referred to as Helliniko.

The complex also includes new training pitches for both Ethnikos' first team and youth team.

Ahead of the 2008–09 season renovations continued and seating capacity was increased to 10,000.

It is currently used as a refugee camp for those awaiting processing in Greece.

References

2004 Summer Olympics official report. Volume 1. p. 269.
Olympicproperties.gr profile.

Buildings and structures completed in 2004
Football venues in Greece
Baseball in Greece
Baseball venues in Europe
Venues of the 2004 Summer Olympics
Stadium
A.O. Glyfada
Olympic baseball venues